Tigre ( tigre or  tigrē), better known in Eritrea by its autonym Tigrayit, is an Eritrean Semitic language spoken in the Horn of Africa. It belongs to the Semitic branch and is primarily spoken by the Tigre people in Eritrea. Along with Tigrinya, it is believed to be the most closely related living language to Ge'ez, which is still in use as the liturgical language of the Eritrean Orthodox Tewahedo Church and Ethiopian Orthodox Tewahedo Church. Tigre has a lexical similarity of 71% with Ge’ez and of 64% with Tigrinya. As of 1997, Tigre was spoken by approximately 800,000 Tigre people in Eritrea. The Tigre mainly inhabit western Eritrea, though they also reside in the northern highlands of Eritrea and its extension into the adjacent part of Sudan, as well as Eritrea's Red Sea coast north of Zula.

The Tigre people are not to be confused with their neighbors to the south, the Tigrinya people of Eritrea and the  Tigrayans of Ethiopia, who speak Tigrinya. Tigrinya is also derived from the parent Geʽez tongue, but is quite distinct from Tigre despite the similarity in name.

Dialects
There are several dialects of Tigre, some of them are; Mansa’ (Mensa), Habab, Barka, Semhar, Algeden, Senhit (Ad-Tekleis, Ad-Temariam, Bet-Juk, Marya Kayah, Maria Tselam) and  Dahalik, which is spoken in Dahlak archipelago. Intelligibility between the dialects is above 91% (except Dahalik), where intelligibility between Dahalik and the other dialects is between 24% to 51%.

Numeral

Cardinal Numbers
 1. ḥate ሐተ or ḥante ሐንተ (f); አሮ 'aro (m)
 2. kili’ē ክልኤ 
 3. sel'ās ሰለአስ
 4. 'arbaʽe አርበዕ
 5. ḥams ሐምስ or ḥamus ሐሙስ
 6. si'es ስእስ or sus ሱስ 
 7. sebuʽi ሰቡዕ
 8. seman ሰመን 
 9. siʽe ሰዕ
 10.ʽasir ዐስር
 11.ʽasir-hatte ዐስር-ሐተ
 12.ʽasir-kil'e ዐስር-ክልኤ 
 ...
 20. ʽisra ዕስረ 
 21. ʽisra w ḥate ዕስረ ወሐተ
 22. ʽisra w kili’ē ዕስረ ወክልኤ 
 ...
 30. selasa ሰለሰ 
 31. selasa w ḥate ሰለሰ ወሐተ
 ...
 40. arbaʽa አርበዐ 
 41. arbaʽa w ḥate አርበዐ ወሐተ
 ...
 50. ḥamsa ሐምሰ 
 51. ḥamsa w ḥate ሐምሰ ወሐተ
 ...
 100. mi'et ምእት
 200. kil'e miʽet ክልኤ ምእት
 300. seles miʽet ሰለአስ ምእት
 ...
 1000. 'alf አልፍ

Ordinal Numbers
Ordinal numbers have both feminine and masculine form. The gender-neutral ordinal numbers are described in the section below. To describe the masculine form –“ay” is added and respective -ayt to describe the feminine form. 
 1st አወል awel: አወላይ/አወላይት awelay/awelayit (m/f) or ቀዳም q’edam : ቀዳማይ/ቀዳሚት qedamay/ qedamit  (m/f)
 2nd ከልእ kaal'e : ከለኣይ/ከለኣይት kale'ay/kale'ayt (m/f)  
 3rd ሰልስ saals   ...
 4rd ረብዕ raab'e  ...
 5th ሐምስ ḥaams ...
 6th ሰድስ saads ...
 7th ሰብዕ saab'e ...
 8th ሰምን saamn ...
 9th ተስዕ taas'e ...
 10th ዐስር 'asr ...

Phonology
Tigre has preserved the two pharyngeal consonants of Ge'ez. The original phonemic distinction according to quality survives in Tigrinya. The vowel , traditionally named "first order vowel", is most commonly transcribed ä in Semitic linguistics.

The phonemes of Tigre are displayed below in both International Phonetic Alphabet (IPA) symbols (indicated by the IPA brackets) and the symbols common (though not universal) among linguists who work on Ethiopian Semitic languages. For the long vowel , the symbol 'ā' is used per Raz (1983). Three consonants, /p, p', x/, occur only in a small number of loanwords, hence they are written in parentheses.

Consonant length
Consonant length is phonemic in Tigre (that is, a pair of words can be distinct by consonant length alone), although there are few such minimal pairs. In this language, long consonants arise almost solely by gemination as a morphological process; there are few, if any, long consonants in word roots. Gemination is especially prominent in verb morphology.

Grammar

These notes use the spelling adopted by Camperio (1936 - see bibliography) which seems to approximate to Italian rules.

Nouns are of two genders, masculine and feminine. 
Indefinite article: masculine uoro አሮ e.g. uoro ennas አሮ እነስ - a man; feminine hatte ሐተ e.g. hatte sit ሐተ እሲት - a woman.
 The definite article, "the", when expressed, is la ለ e.g.  ለጸሐይ ወ ለወርሕ - the sun and the moon.

As we might expect from a Semitic language, specifically feminine forms, where they exist, are often formed of an element with t:
 masculine: አድግ ʼadəg- donkey, ass; feminine: እድግሀት ʼədgəhat - she-ass;
 masculine: ከልብ kalb - dog; feminine: ከልበት kalbat - bitch;
 masculine: ከድመይ kadmay - serving man; ከድመይት kadmayt - serving-woman;
 masculine: መምበ mamba - lord, master;  መምበይት mambayt - lady, mistress.

In a similar way, sound-changes can also mark the difference between singular and plural:
 ነጉስ nəgus - king; negüs - kings; 
 በሐር bahar - sea; አብሑር ʼabhur - seas; 
 እሲት ʼəsit - woman; አንስ ʼans - women;
 ወለት walat - girl; አዋልድ ʼāwaləd - girls;
 መሆር mahor - foal, colt; አምሁር ʼamhur - foals, colts;
 ነቢ nabi - prophet; ነቢያት nabiyat - prophets;
 በገዐት baga‘āt - one sheep; አበግዕ ʼābagəʽ - sheep, plural;
 አርዌ ʼārwē - Snake; አረዊት ārawit - snakes, plural;
 ሖግ ḥog - foot; ሐነግ ḥanag - feet; plural
 እገር ʼəgər - foot; አእጋር ʼā’əgār feet; plural 
 አዘን ʼəzən - ear; አእዛን ʼaʼəzān - ears;
 ሰዐት saʽat - hour; ሰዓታትsaʽātāt - hours;
 አንፍ ʼānəf - nose; አንፎታት ʼanfotāt - noses;
 ህዳይ hədāy - wedding; ህዳያት hədāyāt - weddings;
 አብ ʼāb - father; አበው ʼābaw - fathers;
 እም  ʼəm - mother; እመወት  ʼəmawat - mothers;
 ኮኮብ kokob - star;ከዋክብ kawākəb - stars;
 ጓነ gʷāna - foreigner;ጓኖታት gʷānotāt - foreigners;
 ረአስ raʼas - head; አርእስ ʼarʼəs - heads;
 ጸፍር ṣəfər - paw, hoof; አጸፍር ʼāṣfār - claws, hooves;
 ከብድ kabəd - belly; አክቡድ ʼākbud - bellies.
 ልበስ ləbas- ልበሰት ləbasat clothes

Personal pronouns distinguish "you, masculine" and "you, feminine" in both singular and plural:
አነ ʼana - I, me
እንታ ʼənta - you, singular, masculine
እንቲ ʼənti - you, singular, feminine
ህቱ hətu - he, him, it (masc.)
ህታ həti - she, her, it (fem.)
ሕነ hənna - we, us
እንቱም ʼəntum - you, plural, masculine
እንትን ʼəntən - you, plural, feminine
ህቶም hətom - they, them, masculine
ህተን həten - they, them, feminine

The possessive pronouns appear (a) suffixed to the noun, (b) as separate words:

my - (a) -ya የ example: kətābya ክታብየ- my book; (b) nāy ናየ with masculine nouns; nāya ናየ with feminine nouns; 
your (sing. mas. & fem.) - (a) -ka ካ example: kətābka ክታብካ- your book; (b) with masc. nāyka ናይካ, with fem. nāyki ናይኪ;
his - (a) -u -ኡ example kətābu ክታቡ - his book; (b) with masc. nāyu ናዩ, with fem. nāya ናያ;
our - (a) -na ና example kətābna ክታብና - her book; (b) with masc. nāyna ናይና , with fem. nāyna ናይና;
your (pl. masc. & fem.) - (a) -kum ኩም  (a) -kən ክን example kətabkum ክታብኩም/ክታብክን- your book; (b) with masc. nāykum ናይኩም , with fem. nāykən ናይክን;
their - -om -ኦም example kətābom ክታቦም- their book; (b) with masc. nāyom,ናዮም with fem. nāyan ናየን.

The verb "to be":
ana halleco (o) tu - አና ሀለኮ I am; negative: ihalleco ኢሀለኮ- I'm not;
enta halleco (o) tu - እንታ ህሌካ you (sing. masc.) are; neg. ihalleco ኢሀለኮ- you're not;
enti hallechi tu - እንቲ ሀሌኪ you (sing. fem.) are; neg. ihalleco  ኢሀለኮ;
hötu halla tu ህቱ ሀላ- he is; neg. ihalla ኢሀላ;
höta hallet tu ህታ ሀሌት - she is; neg. ihallet ኢሀሌት;
henna hallena tu ሕና ሀሌና - we are; neg. ihallena  ኢሀሌና;
entum hallecum tu እንቱም ሀሌኩም- you (pl. masc.) are; neg. ihallecum ኢሀሌኩም;
entim hallechen tu እንትን ሀሌክን- you (pl. fem.) are; neg. ihallecum ኢሀሌክን;
hötön hallaa tom ህተን ሀሌያ- they (masc.) are; neg. ihallao ኢሀሌያ;
hötön halleia ten ህተን ሀሌያ - they (fem.) are; neg. ihallao ኢሀሌያ.

The verb "to be", past tense:
...alco ዐልኮ- I was; negative: iálco ኢዐልኮ- I wasn't;
...alca ዐልካ- you (sing. masc.) were; neg. iálca ኢዐልካ;
...alchi ዐልኪ- you (sing. fem.) were; neg. iálca  ኢዐልኪ;
...ala ዐላ- he was; neg. iála ኢዐላ;
...alet ዐለት- she was; neg. iállet ኢዐለት;
...alna ዐልና- we were; neg. iálna ኢዐልና;
...alcum ዐልኩም- you (pl. masc.) were; neg. iálcum ኢዐልኩም;
...alchen ዐልክን- you (pl. fem.) were; neg. iálcum ኢዐልክን;
...alou ዐለው- they (masc.) were; neg. iálou ኢዐለው;
...alaia ዐለያ- they (fem.) were; neg. iáleia ኢዐለያ.

The verb "to have":
Uoro chitab bi-e ዎሮ ኪታብ ብየ - I have a book
Uoro chitab bö-ca ዎሮ ክታብ ብካ- You (sing. masc.) have a book,
and so on, with the last word in each case:
...be-chi ብኪ - you (sing. fem.), etc.
...bu ቡ -  he...
...ba በ -  she...
...be-na ብና- we...
...be-cum ብኩም- you (pl. masc.)...
...be-chin ብክን- you (pl.fem.) ...
...bom ቦም- they (masc.)...
...ben በን- they (fem.)...

The verb "to have": past tense, using a feminine noun as an example:
Hatte bēt álet-ilu ሐተ ቤት ዐልት እሉ - He had a house
Hatte bēt álet-ilka ሐተ ቤት ዐልት እልካ- You (sing. masc.) you had a house,
and so on, with the last word in each case:
...el-ki እልኪ - you (sing. fem.) had a house,
...álet-ollu ዐለት እሉ- he had, etc.
...el-la ዐለት እላ- she had...
...ilna ዐለት እልና- we had...
...elkum ዐለት እልኩም- you pl. masc.) had ...
...el-k-n ዐለት እልክን- you (pl. fem.) had ...
...el-om ዐለት እሎም- they (masc.) had ...
...el-len ዐለት እለን- they (fem.) had ...

Sample

 ሐየት እት ልርእው፣ እብ አሰሩ ሐዙው        When they see a lion, they seek it through its tracks.
 ህኩይ ድራሩ ንኩይ           Lazy's dinner is less
 ህግየ ፍ’ደት ምን ገብእ። አዚም ደሀብ ቱ         When speaking is an obligation, silence is golden
 ምህሮ ኖርቱ ወቅዌት ጽልመት፣ Knowledge is brightness and ignorance darkness. 
Other samples
 ሐል ክም እም ኢትገብእ ወጸሓይ ወርሕ ክም አምዕል
 ለኢልትሐሜ ኢልትሐመድ፣
 ለቤለ ለአሰምዕ ወለዘብጠ ለአደምዕ፣
 ሐሊብ መ ውላዱ ሔሰዩ፣
 ሐምቅ ሐምቁ ምን ረክብ ዜነት ለአፈግር፣
 ምስል ብርድ አከይ ፍርድ

Writing system
Since around 1889, the Ge'ez script (Ethiopic script) has been used to write the Tigre language. Tigre speakers formerly used Arabic more widely as a lingua franca. The Bible has been translated into the Tigre language.

Ge'ez script

Ge'ez script is an abugida, with each character representing a consonant+vowel combination. Ge'ez and its script are also called Ethiopic. The script has been modified slightly to write Tigre.

See also
Beni-Amer people
Tig (Tigrinya language)
Tigre people

Notes

External links

Online Tigre Language Tutorial By Omar M. Kekia
Woldemikael, Tekle M. 2003. Language, Education, and Public Policy in Eritrea. African Studies Review, Apr 2003.
Modaina: History and Language of the Tigre-Speaking Peoples
Tigre in Mozilla Common Voice

Bibliography
Camperio, Manfredo. Manuale Pratico della Lingua Tigrè, Hoepli, Milano, 1936.
Beaton, A.C. & A. Paul (1954). A grammar and vocabulary of the Tigre language (as spoken by the Beni Amer). Khartoum: Publications Bureau.
Elias, David L. (2005). Tigre of Habab: Short Grammar and Texts from the Rigbat People. Ph.D dissertation. Harvard University.
Elias, David L. (2014). The Tigre Language of Gindaˁ, Eritrea: Short Grammar and Texts. (Studies in Semitic Languages and Linguistics, 75.) Brill.
Leslau, Wolf. (1945) Short Grammar of Tigré. Publications of the American Oriental Society, Offprint Series, No. 18. New Haven: American Oriental Society.
Leslau, Wolf. (1945), "The Verb in Tigré", in: Journal of the American Oriental Society 65/1, pp. 1–26.
Leslau, Wolf. (1945), "Grammatical Sketches in Tigré (North Ethiopic): Dialect of Mensa", in: Journal of the American Oriental Society 65/3, pp. 164–203.
Leslau, Wolf. (1948), "Supplementary observations on Tigré grammar", in: Journal of the American Oriental Society 68/3, pp. 127–139.
Littmann, E. (1897), "Die Pronomina in Tigré", in: Zeitschrift für Assyriologie 12, pp. 188–230, 291–316.
Littmann, Enno. (1898), "Das Verbum der Tigre-Sprache", in: Zeitschrift für Assyrologie 13, pp. 133–178; 14, pp. 1–102.
Littmann, Enno. (1910–15). Publications of the Princeton expedition to Abyssinia, 4 vols. in 4, Leyden.
Littmann, Enno. and Höfner, Maria. (1962) Wörterbuch der Tigrē-Sprache: Tigrē-Deutsch-Englisch. Wiesbaden: Franz Steiner Verlag.
Nakano, Aki'o & Yoichi Tsuge (1982). A Vocabulary of Beni Amer Dialect of Tigre. Tokyo: Institute for the Study of Languages and Cultures of Asia and Africa.
Palmer, F.R. (1956). "'Openness' in Tigre: a problem in prosodic statement", in: Bulletin of the School of Oriental and African Studies 18/3, pp. 561–577.
Palmer, F.R. (1961). "Relative clauses in Tigre", in: Word 17/1, pp. 23–33.
Palmer, F.R. (1962). The morphology of the Tigre noun. London: Oxford University Press.
Raz, Shlomo. (1980). "Tigre syntax and Semitic Ethiopian", in: Bulletin of the School of Oriental and African Studies 43/2, pp. 235–250.
Raz, Shlomo. (1980). "The morphology of the Tigre verb (Mansaʿ dialect)", in: Journal of Semitic Studies 25/1, pp. 66–84; 25/2, pp. 205–238.
Raz, Shlomo. (1983). Tigre grammar and texts. Malibu, California, USA: Undena Publications.
SALEH MAHMUD IDRIS. (2015). A Comparative Study of the Tigre Dialects, Semitica et Semitohamitica Berolinensia, 18 (Aachen: Shaker Verlag, 2015)
Sundström, R. (1914). "Some Tigre texts", in: Le Monde Orientale 8, pp. 1–15.
Voigt, Rainer (2008), "Zum Tigre", in: Aethiopica (International Journal of Ethiopian and Eritrean Studies), volume 11, Wiesbaden: Harrasowitz Verlag 2008, pp. 173–193.
Voigt, Rainer and Saleh Mahmud Idris. Zu einer neuen Grammatik des Tigre. Aethiopica 19 (2016, pub. 2017), 245–263.

 
Languages of Eritrea
Languages of Sudan
North Ethiopian Semitic languages